Æon Spoke is an alternative rock band from Los Angeles. It was created by members of Cynic and former members of Death, Paul Masvidal and Sean Reinert, when they relocated from Miami to Los Angeles.

In 2005 the track, "Emmanuel", appeared in the film What the Bleep Do We Know!?. Two of their tracks, "Damaged" and "Transform" also appeared on the Warner Brothers television series Smallville and One Tree Hill respectively. Also another song by Æon Spoke, "I've Seen Those Eyes", appeared in the movie Cry Wolf.

When asked by Nikola Savić about the status of the band in 2012, Paul said:

In 2016, Karlo Doroc from Heavy Blog is Heavy blogzine wrote: 

In , 2022, the self-titled album was rereleased. In an article,  Chris Dick of Decibel Magazine wrote:

Line-up
 Paul Masvidal – lead vocals, guitars, keyboards

Former members
 Chris Tristram – bass
 Stephen Gambina – bass
 Victoria Cecilia – bass
 Evo (E. van Orden) – guitar, effects
 Chris Kringel – bass
 Sean Reinert – drums, percussion, keyboards, backing vocals
R. Walt Vincent - bass, background vocals, keys

Discography

Demos and EPs
 Demo 2000 (2000)
 "Nothing" [aka Damaged] – 2:24
 "Ghostland" – 3:32
 "No Answers" – 3:52
 "Homosapien" – 3:33
 "Is There Anyone" – 02:16
 "Blinded" – 2:41

 Æon Spoke EP (2002)
 "Emmanuel" – 3:33
 "Sand & Foam" – 3:18
 "Silence" – 4:09
 "Blinded" – 2:45
 "For Good" – 3:39
 "No Answers" – 3:15

Radio sessions
 X-posure XFM Session (2003)

 "Umbrella" – 4:00
 "Pablo at the Park" – 5:11
 "Silence" – 4:03

Albums
 Above the Buried Cry (2004)
 Æon Spoke (2007)

Compilation albums
 Nothing (2012)

Videography
Emmanuel [original version] (2004)
Emmanuel [What the Bleep Do We Know!? version] (2005)
Pablo (At the Park) (2007)

Unreleased online songs
(2005)
Tristan & Pelanore – 4:15
Umbrella [BB Mix] – 3:49
Umbrella [Dry TH Mix] – 3:53
When Sunrise Skirts the Moor – 3:52

References

External links
 
 Æon Spoke on Last.fm
 Æon Spoke at SPV GmbH
 Æon Spoke at MusicBrainz
 Æon Spoke at Discogs
 2006 Interview
 2010 Interview

Progressive rock musical groups from California
Musical groups established in 1999
1999 establishments in California